HMS Mersey was a  second class protected cruiser. They were relatively modern, in that they were the first cruisers that had discarded their sailing rigs in the design, that was synonymous with the old wooden warships, and were now solely steam powered warships. She was built at Chatham Dockyard and launched on 31 March 1885, but had a relatively mundane career and was sold for breaking in 1905.

References

 

Mersey-class cruisers
Ships built in Chatham
1885 ships